Injangyang Township (also Njangyang Township) is a township of Myitkyina District in the Kachin State of Burma (Myanmar). The principal town and administrative center is Injangyang. The 2002 population estimate for the township was 23,370.

Borders
Injangyang Township is bordered by:
 Sumpranbum Township to the west and north,
 Hsawlaw Township to the east,
 Chibwe Township to the southeast,
 Waingmaw Township to the south, and
 Myitkyina Township to the southwest.

Notes

External links
"Njangyang Google Satellite Map" Maplandia

Townships of Kachin State